Tempting Faith: An Inside Story of Political Seduction is a book by former Bush White House Deputy Director of the Office of Faith-Based and Community Initiatives David Kuo. The book asserts that the Republican Party, under the leadership of Karl Rove, hijacked and manipulated faith organizations to ensure their support of Republican candidates.

External links
Discussion of the book on Keith Olbermann's Countdown television show

2006 non-fiction books
Books about politics of the United States